CKEM-DT (channel 51) is a television station in Edmonton, Alberta, Canada, part of the Citytv network. It is owned and operated by Rogers Sports & Media alongside Omni Television station CJEO-DT (channel 56). Both stations share studios with Rogers' local radio stations on Gateway Boulevard in Edmonton, while CKEM-DT's transmitter is located near Yellowhead Highway/Highway 16A. The station also operates a rebroadcast transmitter (CKEM-DT-1) in Red Deer on virtual channel 4 (UHF digital channel 15).

History

The station was established by Craig Media Inc., and went on the air for the first time on September 18, 1997 as the flagship station of the A-Channel television system. It promoted itself as a very locally oriented station whose schedule was not drawn up in Toronto, with the slogan "Very Independent, Very Edmonton!"

In 1999, a letter bomb exploded in the CKEM newsroom, injuring the assignment editor and one of the general assignment reporters. The station simulcast the Live@Five and News@Six newscasts from Calgary sister station CKAL-TV, while police investigated the bombing. Local Edmonton newscasts resumed later on in the evening. Raymond Neal Best was charged with attempted murder and possession of explosive substances, in connection with the A-Channel letter bomb, and the attempted letter bombings aimed at both Calgary and Edmonton police chiefs.

On September 17, 2003, several employees who were members of the Canadian Energy and Paperworkers Local 1900 went on strike over worry of jobs being lost, wages, and jobs being moved to Calgary (including master control operations). The strike lasted 166 days. CKEM's master control facilities moved to the CKAL studios in Calgary in late 2003.

In 2004, Craig Media announced a deal to sell the A-Channel stations to CHUM Limited. The sale was approved by the Canadian Radio-television and Telecommunications Commission (CRTC) on November 19, 2004, and became official on December 1. On February 3, 2005, CHUM announced that the A-Channel stations would be relaunched under the Citytv brand (which originated at CITY-TV in Toronto) by that fall, effectively turning Citytv into a television system; the changes took effect on August 2 of that year.

Under Rogers ownership
On July 12, 2006, Bell Globemedia (later known as CTVglobemedia, and now Bell Media) announced plans to take over CHUM Limited. On June 8, 2007, the CRTC announced its approval of CTVglobemedia's purchase of CHUM Limited, but added a condition that CTVglobemedia must sell off CHUM's Citytv stations (including CKEM) to another buyer while keeping the A-Channel stations since the company already owned CTV owned-and-operated station CFRN-TV (channel 3) in the same market. The following Monday, it was announced that Rogers Communications would buy the Citytv system's stations. The sale was approved by the CRTC on September 28, 2007, and was finalized on one month later on October 31.

In late 2015, Rogers' television stations in Edmonton moved from their studios in downtown Edmonton to the headquarters of Rogers' Edmonton radio stations on Gateway Boulevard.

News operation
CKEM presently broadcasts 14 hours of locally produced newscasts per-week.

On July 12, 2006, the station's local newscasts (with the exception of CityNews at Noon) were immediately cancelled after years of ratings struggle in the Edmonton market. The local newscasts were replaced by a half-hour newsmagazine program called Your City at 6 and 11 p.m., along with a national and international newscast called CityNews International (produced at CITY-TV's studios in Toronto). On January 19, 2010, CityNews at Noon, Your City and CityNews International were cancelled as part of Citytv's corporate restructuring and concurrent layoffs.

On May 7, 2015, Rogers announced that as part of further cuts, Breakfast Television would be cancelled on May 19, 2015. It was replaced by the spin-off Dinner Television, a two-hour newsmagazine and discussion program hosted by Jason Strudwick. The program did not feature original news reporting. An encore of the previous night's Dinner Television with on-screen news, weather, and traffic updates replaced Breakfast Television in its morning timeslot.

On September 4, 2017, after a seven-year hiatus, CityNews was relaunched as part of an expansion of local news programming by Citytv's stations. The station airs hour-long newscasts at 6 and 11 p.m. nightly (with the former replacing Dinner Television). Similarly to the format of its sister station in Toronto, CKEM's newscasts use an "anchorless" format, where all stories are presented by videojournalists on the field, eschewing in-studio anchors.

Technical information

Subchannel

Analogue-to-digital conversion
On May 26, 2010, CKEM began testing its digital signal with the broadcast of a test loop. On June 29 of that year, the station began broadcasting regular programming over its digital signal. On August 31, 2011, when Canadian television stations in CRTC-designated mandatory markets transitioned from analogue to digital broadcasts, the station's digital signal relocated from UHF channel 51 to channel 17. Through the use of PSIP, digital television receivers originally displayed CKEM-DT's virtual channel as 51.1.

On February 28, 2020, Rogers applied for permission to convert their Red Deer repeater (CKEM-TV-1) to digital operations as part of the 600 MHz spectrum auction. The upgrade entailed moving from VHF 4 at 7 kW (at 229.7 metres HAAT) to UHF 15 at 35 kW (at 225.6 metres HAAT). The analogue signal was shut off on November 17, 2020.

Rebroadcaster

References

External links

Canadian Communications Foundation – CKEM-TV History

KEM-DT
Television channels and stations established in 1997
KEM-DT
1997 establishments in Alberta